The Prix Ernest-Cormier is an award by the Government of Quebec that is part of the Prix du Québec, given to individuals for an outstanding career in Quebec architecture. It was first awarded in 2014. It is named in honour of Ernest Cormier.

Winners

See also
 Architecture of Montreal
 Architecture of Canada
 Prix du Québec

References
 Prix Ernest-Cormier - List of recipients

Prix du Québec